The governor of Curaçao is the representative on Curaçao of the Dutch head of state (King Willem-Alexander). The governor's duties are twofold: representing and guarding the general interests of the Kingdom and heading the government of Curaçao. The governor is accountable to the government of the Kingdom of the Netherlands. As the head of the government, the governor is immune. The governor exercises the executive power under the responsibility of the ministers, who are responsible to the Estates of Curaçao. The governor does not have political responsibilities and is not part of the cabinet. During the formation of a cabinet the governor plays an important role. The governor is appointed by the monarch for a period of six years. This period can be prolonged for one more term of six years. The governor is supported by his secretariat the cabinet of the governor, and is advised by the Council of Advice, consisting of at least five members, appointed by the governor, who advise on the drafts of state ordinances, state decrees, kingdom acts and general administrative orders.

List of governors 

On 10 October 2010 Curaçao attained the status as a separate country within the Kingdom of the Netherlands (status aparte). Before this date the governor of the Netherlands Antilles was also governor for Curaçao. The first governor of Curaçao is Frits Goedgedrag, who also was governor of the Netherlands Antilles before that country's dissolution on 10 October 2010. He resigned at the end of 2012 due to health reasons, after which his responsibilities were taken over by acting governor Adèle van der Pluijm-Vrede (who had taken up her office on 10 October 2010 as well). Acting Governor Adèle van der Pluijm-Vrede swore in her deputy as second acting governor, N.C. Römer-Kenepa, on 24 June 2013 at Fort Amsterdam. On 4 November 2013 Lucille George-Wout was sworn in by King Willem-Alexander as the new governor of Curaçao.

See also 
 Major-General (later General) John Studholme Hodgson, appointed governor and commander-in-chief of the Island of Curaçao by the British government (which ruled Curaçao from 1807 to 1815) in 1811.

References

External links 
 

Politics of Curaçao